Ain Sifni also known as Shekhan, is a town and subdistrict in Nineveh Governorate, Iraq. It is located in the Shekhan District in the Nineveh Plains.

In the town, there is a Chaldean Catholic church of Mar Yousif, and a church of Mar Gewargis of the Ancient Church of the East. There are also seven Yazidi religious monuments, including mausoleums of Sheikh ‘Alî Chamse and Sheikh Hantuch, and shrines of Sheikh Adi, Nishingaha Peroz, and Sheikh Mushelleh.

Etymology
The Kurdish name of the town is derived from the plural form of "sheikh" ("holy man" in Kurdish), and thus translates to "[the land of the] holy men", whereas the Arabic name is interpreted to stem from Aïn as Safīna in reference to the Yazidi tradition that the town was the location of the construction of Noah's Ark.

History
According to Yazidi tradition, Ain Sifni was the residence of Noah and location of the construction of Noah's Ark. Ain Sifni is attested as a diocese of the Church of the East in 576 AD, in which year its bishop Bar Sahde attended the synod of Catholicos Ezekiel of Seleucia-Ctesiphon. The town served as the centre of the subdistrict of Bēth Rustāqa which, as a consequence of the spread of the Syriac Orthodox Church in the district of Bēth Nūhadrā in the late sixth and early seventh centuries, was transferred to the district of Marghā in the late eighth century.

Ain Sifni likely remained mostly Christian until the thirteenth or fourteenth centuries. It is suggested that the mausoleum of Sheikh ‘Alî Chamse was constructed in the 15th century.  The district of Ain Sifni was founded on 16 December 1924. Assyrians of the Baz clan of Hakkari settled at Ain Sifni after the Assyrian genocide in the First World War, and were attacked by the Iraqi army during the Simele massacre in 1933. Until the arrival of the Assyrians, Ain Sifni was populated only by Yazidis and Jews. The Chaldean Catholic church of Mar Yousif was rebuilt in 1960, replacing an older church built in 1946-1948. By 1961, 180 Chaldean Catholics inhabited the town.

The Yazidi population of Ain Sifni was forcibly relocated to Mahad in 1975 by the Iraqi government as part of its policy of Arabisation, and the town was resettled by Arabs. During the 2003 invasion of Iraq, two Iraqi military installations near Ain Sifni were struck by US airstrikes on 24 March. Two battalions of the Iraqi 108th Regiment, 8th Infantry Division, were stationed at the town at this time. The US bombing campaign against the garrison was ineffective, and an entire Iraqi battalion withdrew with no casualties. On 6 April, ODAs 051, 055, and 056 of the US 10th Special Forces Group and 300 Peshmerga soldiers of the 12th Supay (battalion) seized the town, and 33 Iraqis were killed, 54 wounded, and 230 taken prisoner, and 1 Peshmerga casualty.

In the aftermath of the fall of President Saddam Hussein in 2003, the Arab settlers fled Ain Sifni, allowing its former population to return. In January 2005, it was reported that the Kurdistan Democratic Party blocked the delivery of ballot boxes to Ain Sifni, thereby ensuring its population was unable to vote in the Iraqi parliamentary election. The Kurdistan Regional Government (KRG) signed a production sharing contract with Hunt Oil Company to extract oil near Ain Sifni in September 2007, despite the town being officially outside the control of the KRG, and has since been declared illegal by the Iraqi government. The concession at Ain Sifni is estimated to have reservoirs of 900 million recoverable barrels of oil.

A priest house and community hall for local Christians was constructed by the Supreme Committee of Christian Affairs by December 2012. The town had an estimated population of 11,498 in 2013. Most of the town's population of 16,000 people fled during the Islamic State of Iraq and the Levant (ISIL) offensive in August 2014, and under 500 men remained to defend Ain Sifni under the leadership of mayor Mamo al-Bagsri. Prior to the ISIL offensive, Ain Sifni was inhabited by 700 families, of which 80% were Yazidi, 10% were Christian, and 10% were Muslim. Humanitarian aid was delivered to Ain Sifni by the Assyrian Aid Society in November 2014. In October 2017, 560 Assyrians with 140 families inhabited Ain Sifni.

By June 2018, the population had dropped to 200 families. In November 2018, the refugee camp at Ain Sifni, which is inhabited by Yazidi refugees, was flooded by heavy rainfall. The town was the residence of the Yazidi Emir Tahseen Said until he went into exile in Germany, where he died, and was buried at Ain Sifni on 5 February 2019. Ain Sifni is largely populated by Yazidis, most of whom speak Kurmanji Kurdish.

Geography

Climate
Ain Sifni has a Mediterranean climate (Köppen climate classification: Csa).

Gallery

See also
 Assyrians in Iraq
 Yazidis in Iraq

References
Notes

Citations

Bibliography

 

Populated places in Nineveh Governorate
Yazidi populated places in Iraq
Assyrian communities in Iraq
Nineveh Plains
Historic Jewish communities in Iraq
Subdistricts of Iraq
Populated places in Dohuk Province
District capitals of Iraq